Bruno Miguel Alexandre da Cunha Nogueira (born 31 January 1982) is a Portuguese actor, comedian, writer and television host.

He started his career as an actor on a soap opera called "Anjo Selvagem" in 2002. In 2003, he started hosting Curto Circuito on the cable channel Sic Radical. However, it was through the stand-up comedy that he has become best known, in programs such as "Levanta-te e Ri" (2003–06), "Manobras de Diversão" (2004–05) or "HermanSIC" (2004–05).

In 2008, he started the comedy show Os Contemporâneos relying primarily on satire of current political and social issues. The final episode aired 2 August 2009. In April 2010, he started hosting Lado B (the B side), his own talk-show.

Nogueira created Odisseia with Gonçalo Waddington and Tiago Guedes in 2013.

References 

1982 births
Living people
Golden Globes (Portugal) winners
People from Lisbon
Portuguese male comedians
Portuguese male television actors
Portuguese male voice actors
Portuguese stand-up comedians
Portuguese television presenters